Barnes power station supplied electricity to the urban district of Barnes in south west London from 1901 to 1959. It was owned and operated by Barnes District Council until the nationalisation of the British electricity supply industry in 1948. The power station was decommissioned in 1959 and the building has been reused.

History
In 1898 Barnes Urban District Council applied for a Provisional Order under the Electric Lighting Acts to generate and supply electricity to the district. This was granted by the Board of Trade and was confirmed by Parliament through the Electric Lighting Orders Confirmation (No. 4) Act 1898 (61 & 62 Vict. c. xl). The power station was built in Mortlake High Street (51°28'13"N 0°15'29"W) and first supplied electricity in May 1901.

Equipment specification
The original plant at power station comprised five reciprocating engines driven by steam from coal-fired boilers:

 2 × 150 kW
 2 × 300 kW
 1 × 600 kW

These gave a total direct current generating capacity of 1,500 kW.

Following the First World War a 1,500 kW turbo-alternator was installed, this generated an alternating current supply.

By 1954 the plant comprised:

 Boilers:
 2 × Babcock and Wilcox 20,000 lb/h coal-fired boilers operating at 200 psi and 630 °F (2.5 kg/s, 13.8 bar and 332 °C),
 1 × Stirling 40,000 lb/h coal-fired boiler operating at 210 psi and 680 °F (5.04 kg/s, 14.5 bar and 360 °C)
 Turbo-alternators:
 2 × English Electric 1.5 MW turbo-alternators, running at 3,000 rpm
 1 × English Electric 3.5 MW turbo-alternators, running at 3,000 rpm

Cooling water was taken from the River Thames.

Electricity was supplied to customers at 210 and 420 volts DC.

Operations
Operational data for the early years of operation was as follows:

The data demonstrates the growth in number of consumers, lamps and the amount of current sold.

Operating data 1921–23
The operating data for the period 1921–23 is as follows:

The data demonstrates the yearly growth of demand and use of electricity.

Under the terms of the Electricity (Supply) Act 1926 (16-17 Geo. 5 c. 51) the Central Electricity Board (CEB) was established in 1926. The CEB identified high efficiency ‘selected’ power stations that would supply electricity most effectively. The CEB also constructed the national grid (1927–33) to connect power stations within a region. Barnes power station was electrically connected to Hammersmith power station by three underground 6.6 kV circuits.

Operating data 1937 and 1946
Barnes power station operating data for 1937 and 1946 is given below:

The British electricity supply industry was nationalised in 1948 under the provisions of the Electricity Act 1947 (10-11 Geo. 6 c. 54). The Barnes electricity undertaking was abolished, ownership of Barnes power station was vested in the British Electricity Authority, and subsequently the Central Electricity Authority and the Central Electricity Generating Board (CEGB). At the same time the electricity distribution and sales responsibilities of the Barnes electricity undertaking were transferred to the London Electricity Board (LEB).

Operating data 1954–58
Operating data for the period 1954–58 is shown in the table:

The data demonstrates the low utilization of the plant during its final years. The amount of electricity, in MWh, sent out by Barnes power station throughout its operational life is:

Closure
Barnes power station was decommissioned on 1959. The equipment was removed and the buildings were redeveloped, and are called 'The Old Power Station'.

See also
 Timeline of the UK electricity supply industry
 List of power stations in England

References

Coal-fired power stations in England
Demolished power stations in the United Kingdom
Former power stations in England
Power stations on the River Thames
Former power stations in London